"Million Bucks" is a song by American hip hop recording artist Maino, taken from his debut studio album, If Tomorrow Comes.... The song, released July 3, 2009, serves as the third single and features vocals and production from Swizz Beatz.

Background
When asked about the record Maino said:

Music video
A music video was shot in Brooklyn, New York with director Edwin Decena. Rappers Red Cafe, Kayto, Lil Mama, Uncle Murda & Grafh made cameo appearances. A Behind the scenes preview was released on June 15, 2009. The video was released July 9 on Maino's Twitter account.

Chart positions

References

External links
Maino Ft. Swizz Beatz – Million Bucks Music Video 
Maino Ft. Swizz Beatz – Million Bucks Lyrics 

2009 singles
2009 songs
Maino songs
Swizz Beatz songs
Song recordings produced by Swizz Beatz
Songs written by Swizz Beatz
Atlantic Records singles
Songs written by Maino